This is a list of diplomatic missions in Liberia.  the capital city, Monrovia, hosts 20 embassies. Other diplomatic missions are the delegation of the European Union and a Swiss Consular Representative Agency.

Embassies
Monrovia

Missions
Monrovia
  (Delegation)
  (Swiss Cooperation Office and Consular Agency)

Non-resident embassies

  (Abuja)
  (Accra)
  (Dakar)
  (Abuja)
  (Abidjan)
  (Accra)
  (Abidjan)
  (London)
  (Accra)
  (Accra)
  (Abuja)
  (Abuja)
 (Abidjan)
  (Abuja)
  (Abidjan)
  (Abidjan)
  (Accra)
  (Tripoli)
  (Conakry)
  (Accra)
  (Dakar)
  (Abidjan)
  (Abuja)
  (Abuja)
  (Dakar)
  (Abuja)
  (Abidjan)
  (Accra) 
  (Accra)
  (New York City)
  (Abuja)
  (Abidjan)
  (Abidjan)
  (Abuja)
  (Abuja)
  (Abuja)

See also
 Foreign relations of Liberia
 List of diplomatic missions of Liberia

References

Foreign relations of Liberia
Diplomatic missions
Liberia